John Tanner (fl. c. 1400) was the member of Parliament for Malmesbury for the parliament of 1402.

References 

Members of the Parliament of England for Malmesbury
English MPs 1402
Year of birth unknown
Year of death unknown